Boxford Rovers Football Club is a youth and men's senior football club based in Boxford, Suffolk, in the Suffolk district of Babergh. The football club currently has two junior boy's teams and an adult men's first team, which competes in the Essex and Suffolk Border League Division Five. 

The club plays its home games at Homefields in Boxford, which has a small clubhouse which doubles for a cricket pavilion in the summer for Edwardstone Cricket Club.

History 
Club football in Boxford dates back to at least 1919. The original ground was Rectory Park, where houses have now been built. Rectory Park was used until the current Homefield ground was bought by the village in the late Sixties from Ipswich brewers Tolly Cobbold for £160.

Boxford Youth FC played at Homefield from 1974, started by Gordon Atkinson. Its successor, Boxford Rovers Youth FC, came into existence in 1977, with Gordon as manager, when the players wanted to play in a competitive league. The team played in the U12 section of the Suffolk and Essex Sunday Youth Football Combination.

Footballing glamour came calling in April 1979, when the team toured to the US, visiting New York and Boxford, Massachusetts for two weeks. The whole squad of 15 boys, accompanied by four of their fathers, made the trip, and were looked after by families in Massapequa, Long Island and Boxford, Massachusetts. The following year, the Massapequa boys came to Boxford for a return visit.

Youth football 
Throughout the majority of the 1980s and 1990s, Boxford Rovers Youth Football Club played matches in the Colchester Youth Football League  and more recently (2000s/2010s) the youth teams have moved to the Ipswich & Suffolk Youth Football League or the Suffolk Youth Football League. However, by 2022/23 season, the club had just two junior boy's teams and no minis football, at its peak the club had 15 teams including minis, junior and girls football but with local competition from Hadleigh, Great Cornard and Sudbury, the club has considerably shrunk.

Adult football 
There have been men's football at Boxford since the turn of the twentieth century, with teams also representing Edwardstone for brief periods. However, it wasn't until the 1999/2000 season that the club finally made a foray into Sunday league football as part of the Sudbury Sunday Football League  (which merged into The Treadfirst Sudbury & Haverhill District Sunday Football League in the mid 2000s). After four successful seasons with straight promotions, Boxford Rovers joined the Colchester & East Essex Football League (now sadly defunct) and played Saturday football, again earning four promotions. They were elected in the Suffolk and Ipswich League Division Three in 2010 and earned another promotion to Division Two. However, in 2014/15 the club was forced to fold following a slump in local footballers looking for Saturday football.

Renaissance 
The club reformed in April 2022, initially playing home games at Webb's Meadow in Nayland - behind Nayland Village Hall. But, after discussions with the Essex and Suffolk Border League, the club was allowed to move back to Homefields in November 2022 and started an appeal to upgrade facilities.

As of January 2023, the club was sitting in second place in Division Five of the Border League and actively seeking promotion.

References 

Football clubs in Suffolk
1979 establishments
1979 establishments in the United Kingdom